The Jaskółka class was a class of six minesweepers of the Polish Navy built during the 1930s. They were the first sea-going warships of Polish production. The Jaskółka class was a versatile design which allowed the ships to serve in the role of either a minesweeper, small minelayer or a sub chaser. All were named after birds, therefore the class was nicknamed: ptaszki.

Design and building

The first minesweepers in the Polish Navy were the German minesweepers of the FM type. These ships, built during the later part of World War I and bought by Poland during the early 20s, were already worn out by the 1930s so the Polish Navy required a replacement. The Modlin shipyard offered a design for the new class of minesweepers which was accepted. The first four ships of the class were built at Gdynia and Modlin. After they entered service they proved to be a good design so a further two were ordered in the mid 30s.

Service

World War II

Post war

Ships

References

 Mały Modelarz 3/2000

Mine warfare vessel classes
Ships built in Poland